Badalbeyli, is a surname of Azerbaijani origin. It is also a name connected to a noble family from Azerbaijan. People with this name include:
 Afrasiyab Badalbeyli (1907–1976), Soviet Azerbaijani composer, of Persian descent 
 Ahmed Badalbeyli (1884–1954), Soviet Azerbaijani opera singer, mugam singer and actor. 
 Farhad Badalbeyli (born 1947), Soviet and Azerbaijani pianist and composer
 Shamsi Badalbeyli (1911–1987), Soviet Azerbaijani theatre director

See also 
 Badal (disambiguation)

Surnames of Asian origin
Badalbeyli family